Puck is an inner moon of Uranus. It was discovered in December 1985 by the Voyager 2 spacecraft. The name Puck follows the convention of naming Uranus's moons after characters from Shakespeare. The orbit of Puck lies between the rings of Uranus and the first of Uranus's large moons, Miranda. Puck is approximately spherical in shape and has diameter of about 162 km. It has a dark, heavily cratered surface, which shows spectral signs of water ice.

Discovery and naming 

Puck—the largest inner moon of Uranus—was discovered from the images taken by Voyager 2 on 30 December 1985. It was given the temporary designation S/1985 U 1.

The moon was later named after the character Puck who appears in Shakespeare's A Midsummer Night's Dream, a little sprite who travels around the globe at night with the fairies. In Celtic mythology and English folklore, a Puck is a mischievous sprite, imagined as an evil demon by Christians.

It is also designated Uranus XV.

Physical characteristics 

Puck is the largest small inner moon of Uranus, which orbits inside the orbit of Miranda. It is intermediate in size between Portia (the second-largest inner moon) and Miranda (the smallest of the five large classical moons). Puck's orbit is located between the rings of Uranus and Miranda. Little is known about Puck aside from its orbit, radius of about 81 km, and geometric albedo in visible light of approximately 0.11.

Of the moons discovered by the Voyager 2 imaging team, only Puck was discovered early enough that the probe could be programmed to image it in some detail. Images showed that Puck has a shape of a slightly prolate spheroid (ratio between axes is 0.97 ± 0.04). Its surface is heavily cratered and is grey in color. There are three named craters on the surface of Puck, the largest being about 45 km in diameter. Observations with the Hubble Space Telescope and large terrestrial telescopes found water-ice absorption features in the spectrum of Puck.

Nothing is known about the internal structure of Puck. It is probably made of a mixture of water ice with the dark material similar to that found in the rings. This dark material is probably made of rocks or radiation-processed organics. The absence of craters with bright rays implies that Puck is not differentiated, meaning that ice and non-ice components have not separated from each other into a core and mantle.

Named features

Puckian craters are named after mischievous spirits in European mythology.

See also 
 Moons of Uranus
 Rings of Uranus
 List of geological features on Puck

References 

Explanatory notes

Citations

Sources

External links 

 Page that includes a reprocessed version of the Voyager 2 Puck image

Moons of Uranus
19851230
Things named after Shakespearean works
Moons with a prograde orbit
A Midsummer Night's Dream